Paul Henry Marcotte (January 26, 1928 – December 4, 2012) was an American businessman and politician.

Born in La Crosse, Wisconsin, Marcotte graduated from Aquinas High School. Marcotte served in the United States Army. He then graduated from Saint John' University in Collegeville, Minnesota. He studied economics at the University of Vienna. Marcotte then worked in the newspaper and food industries in Wisconsin, Illinois, and Ohio. He worked for Ohio Valley AFM, Inc. He served in the Kentucky House of Representatives from Union, Kentucky from 1995 to 2007 and was a Republican. He died in Union, Kentucky.

Notes

1928 births
2012 deaths
Politicians from La Crosse, Wisconsin
People from Boone County, Kentucky
Military personnel from Wisconsin
Aquinas High School (La Crosse, Wisconsin) alumni
College of Saint Benedict and Saint John's University alumni
University of Vienna alumni
Businesspeople from Kentucky
Republican Party members of the Kentucky House of Representatives
20th-century American businesspeople